Sunil Bansal (born 20 September 1969) is an Indian politician of Bhartiya Janata Party from Rajasthan. Bansal presently is the National General Secretary of Bhartiya Janta Party. Bansal was the general secretary (organisation) in Uttar Pradesh. On 10 August 2022, Bansal was appointed as the National General Secretary of Bharatiya Janata Party and in-charge of West Bengal, Telangana and Odisha.

Political career 
Bansal share a common background in Akhil Bhartiya Vidyarthi Parishad. Bansal got elected as the general secretary of Rajasthan University in students election in 1989. He has been associated with Rashtriya Swayamsevak Sangh before joining BJP. From there, he rose to the position of National Joint Organizing Secretary of ABVP serving in various capacities. He has been at the forefront of anti-corruption movement and has played an active role as the National Convener of Youth Against Corruption (YAC) from 2010 to 2014. He has written books and articles on national security, Indian educational system, systemic reforms etc. 
He is considered to be a close associate of Amit Shah. Bansal was appointed Co - Incharge of Uttar Pradesh during 2014 Indian general election. Sunil Bansal acted as one of the major planner for The BJP win in the U.P election in 2017 and in UP General Election 2019.

Posts held

References

Living people
1969 births
Bharatiya Janata Party politicians from Rajasthan